Highway 349 is a highway in the Canadian province of Saskatchewan. It runs from Highway 6 near Naicam to Highway 38.

Highway 349 passes through the communities of Dahlton, Archerwill, and Nobleville. It intersects Highway 679 and is concurrent with Highway 35 for 14 km.

Major intersections

References

349